Vatra Games s.r.o was a Czech video game development company based in Brno. Its parent company was Kuju Entertainment. The company was founded in 2009 when Kuju Entertainment was looking for developers to make a new studio. At the same time, several developers from 2K Czech were retiring. These developers decided to set up a new studio, which became Vatra Games. In July 2012, four months after the March release of Silent Hill: Downpour, Kuju Entertainment Limited terminated its contract with Vatra Games. In September 2012, Vatra Games was declared bankrupt.

Games developed

References

Video game development companies
Video game companies established in 2009
Video game companies disestablished in 2012
Defunct video game companies of the Czech Republic
Companies based in Brno
2009 establishments in the Czech Republic
2012 disestablishments in the Czech Republic